Nigeria competed at the 1988 Summer Olympics in Seoul, South Korea.

Competitors
The following is the list of number of competitors in the Games.

Results by event

Athletics
Men's 4 × 100 m Relay
 Victor Edet, Davidson Ezinwa, Abdullahi Tetengi, and Olatunji Olobia
 Heat – 39.15
 Victor Edet, Olapade Adeniken, Isiaq Adeyanju, and Olatunji Olobia
 Semi Final – 39.05 (→ did not advance)

Men's 4 × 400 m Relay
 Sunday Uti, Moses Ugbisie, Henry Amike, and Innocent Egbunike
 Heat – 3:06.59
 Semi Final – 3:01.13 
 Final – 3:02.50 (→ 7th place)

Men's Marathon 
 Yohanna Waziri — 2"29.14 (→ 60th place) 
 Abbas Mohammed — 2"35.26 (→ 70th place)

Men's Long Jump 
 Yusuf Ali 
 Qualification — 7.73m (→ did not advance)

Men's Discus Throw 
 Adewale Olukoju
 Qualification — 54.44m (→ did not advance)

Women's 4 × 400 m Relay 
 Falilat Ogunkoya, Kehinde Vaughan, Airat Bakare, and Mary Onyali 
 Heat — 3:30.21 (→ did not advance)

Women's Discus Throw
 Grace Apiafi
 Qualification – 49.84m (→ did not advance)

Women's Shot Put
 Grace Apiafi
 Qualification — 15.06m (→ did not advance)

Football (soccer)
 Preliminary round (group D)
 Nigeria — Brazil 0-4
 Nigeria — Yugoslavia 1-3
 Nigeria — Australia 0-1
 Quarter Finals
 Did not advance
Team roster
 ( 1.) David Ngodigha
 ( 2.) Emeka Ezeugo
 ( 3.) Andrew Uwe
 ( 4.) Ademola Adeshina
 ( 5.) Chidi Nwanu
 ( 6.) Dahiru Sadi
 ( 7.) Augustine Eguavoen
 ( 8.) Sylvanus Okpala
 ( 9.) Dominic Iorfa
 (10.) Samuel Okwaraji
 (11.) Rashidi Yekini
 (12.) Christian Obi
 (13.) Mike Obiku
 (14.) Bright Omokaro
 (15.) Samson Siasia
 (16.) Osaro Obobaifo
 (17.) Wole Odegbami
 (18.) Ndubuisi Okosieme
 (19.) Jude Agada
 (20.) Henry Nwosu
Head coach: Manfred Höner

Tennis
Men's Singles Competition
 Sadiq Abdullahi
 First round — Lost to Javier Sánchez (Spain) 2-6, 5-7, 3-6
 Tony Mmoh
 First round — Defeated Wojtek Kowalski (Poland) 6-2, 6-4, 6-4
 Second round — Lost to Michiel Schapers (Netherlands) 6-4, 3-6, 1-6, 6-4, 1-6
 Nduka Odizor
 First round — Lost to Robert Seguso (United States) 4-6, 3-6, 2-6

Weightlifting
Men's Lightweight
Lawrence Iquaibom

Men's Light-Heavyweight
Muyiwa Odusanya

Men's Middle-Heavyweight
Olusola Awosina

Men's Super-Heavyweight
Gilberg Ojadi Aduche

See also
 Nigeria at the 1986 Commonwealth Games
 Nigeria at the 1990 Commonwealth Games

References

Official Olympic Reports
sports-reference

Nations at the 1988 Summer Olympics
1988
Olympic Games